The men's +80 kg competition in Taekwondo at the 2020 Summer Olympics was held on 27 July 2021, at the Makuhari Messe Hall A.

Results

Main bracket

Repechage

References

External links
Draw 

Men's +80 kg
Men's events at the 2020 Summer Olympics